Positive liberty is the possession of the power and resources to act in the context of the structural limitations of the broader society which impacts a person's ability to act, as opposed to negative liberty, which is freedom from external restraint on one's actions.

As Heyman notes, it is important to understand Isaiah Berlin's two definitions of liberty in the context of the ideological circumstances of the 1950's, so a conception of positive liberty includes freedom from external constraints, leading to an understanding of positive liberty in the context of human agency. According to Charles Taylor, Positive liberty is the ability to fulfill one's purposes. Negative liberty is the freedom from interference by others.

The concepts of structure and agency are central to the concept of positive liberty because in order to be free, a person should be free from inhibitions of the social structure in carrying out their ambitions.  Structurally, classism, sexism, ageism, ableism and racism can inhibit a person's freedom. As positive liberty is primarily concerned with the possession of sociological agency, it is enhanced by the ability of citizens to participate in government and have their voices, interests, and concerns recognized and acted upon.

Isaiah Berlin's essay "Two Concepts of Liberty" (1958) is typically acknowledged as the first to explicitly draw the distinction between positive and negative liberty.

Overview 

Charles Taylor works to resolve one of the issues that separate ‘positive’ and ‘negative’ theories of freedom, as these have been distinguished in Isaiah Berlin's seminal essay, ‘Two concepts of liberty'. He sees it as undeniable that there are two such families of conceptions of political freedom.

Thus, Taylor clarifies that there are two competing theories. One aims to define freedom exclusively in terms of the independence of the individual from interference by others, be these governments, corporations, or private persons; this theory is challenged by those who believe that freedom resides at least in part in collective control over the common life.

Negative liberty is a concept that is often used in political philosophy. It is the idea that freedom means being able to do what you want, without any external obstacles. This concept has been criticized for being too simplistic and not taking into account the importance of individual self-realization.

Taylor suggests that negative liberty is little more than a philosophical term and that real liberty is achieved when significant social and economic inequalities are also considered. He proposed dialectical positive liberty as a means to gaining both negative and positive liberty, by overcoming the inequalities that divide us.

According to Taylor, restricting the expression of people's religious and ethical convictions is more significant than restricting their movement around uninhabited parts of the country; and both are more significant than the trivia of traffic control. But the Hobbesian scheme has no place for the notion of significance. It will allow only for purely quantitative judgments.

Further, Taylor argues that the Hobbes-Bentham view is indefensible as a view of freedom. Faced with this two-step process, it seems safer and easier to stop it at the first step, to insist firmly that freedom is just a matter of the absence of external obstacles, that it, therefore, involves no discrimination of motivation and permits in principle no second-guessing of the subject by anyone else. This is the essence of the Maginot Line strategy and it is very tempting; (here, Taylor is referring to ways in which one can "fortify" an argument). But, he claims this is wrong, we cannot defend a view of freedom that does not involve at least some qualitative discrimination as to motive, that is which does not put some restrictions on motivation among the necessary conditions for freedom, and hence which could rule out second-guessing in principle.

Therefore, Taylor argues for a distinction between negative and positive liberty that highlights the importance of social justice.

History 
Jean-Jacques Rousseau's theory of freedom, according to which individual freedom is achieved through participation in the process whereby one's community exercises collective control over its own affairs in accordance with the "general will". Some interpret The Social Contract to suggest that Rousseau believed that liberty was the power of individual citizens to act in the government to bring about changes; this is essentially the power for self-governance and democracy. Rousseau himself said, "the mere impulse to appetite is slavery, while obedience to law we prescribe ourselves is liberty." For Rousseau, the passage from the state of nature to the civil state substitutes justice for instinct gives his actions the morality they had formerly lacked.

G. F. W. Hegel wrote in his Elements of the Philosophy of Right (in the part in which he introduced the concept of the sphere of abstract right) that "duty is not a restriction on freedom, but only on freedom in the abstract" and that "duty is the attainment of our essence, the winning of positive freedom.

Examples 
In the description of positive liberty from the Stanford Encyclopedia of Philosophy,
Put in the simplest terms, one might say that a democratic society is a free society because it is a self-determined society, and that a member of that society is free to the extent that he or she participates in its democratic process. But there are also individualist applications of the concept of positive freedom. For example, it is sometimes said that a government should aim actively to create the conditions necessary for individuals to be self-sufficient or to achieve self-realization.

In "Recovering the Social Contract", Ron Replogle made a metaphor that is helpful in understanding positive liberty. "Surely, it is no assault on my dignity as a person if you take my car keys, against my will, when I have had too much to drink. There is nothing paradoxical about making an agreement beforehand providing for paternalistic supervision in circumstances when our competence is open to doubt." In this sense, positive liberty is the adherence to a set of rules agreed upon by all parties involved, all of whom must agree to any alterations to the rules. Therefore, positive liberty is a contractarian philosophy.

However, Isaiah Berlin opposed any suggestion that paternalism and positive liberty could be equivalent. He stated that positive liberty could only apply when the withdrawal of liberty from an individual was in pursuit of a choice that individual himself/herself made, not a general principle of society or any other person's opinion. In the case where a person removes a driver's car keys against their will because they have had too much to drink, this constitutes positive freedom only if the driver has made, of their own free will, an earlier decision not to drive drunk.  Thus, by removing the keys, the other person facilitates this decision and ensures that it will be upheld in the face of paradoxical behaviour (i.e., drinking) by the driver.  For the remover to remove the keys in the absence of such an expressed intent by the driver, because the remover feels that the driver ought not to drive drunk, is paternalism, and not positive freedom by Berlin's definition.

Erich Fromm sees the distinction between the two types of freedom emerging alongside humanity's evolution away from the instinctual activity that characterizes lower animal forms. This aspect of freedom, he argues, "is here used not in its positive sense of 'freedom to' but in its negative sense of 'freedom from', namely freedom from instinctual determination of his actions." For Fromm, freedom from animal instinct implicitly implies that survival now hinges on the necessity of charting one's own course.  He relates this distinction to the biblical story of man's expulsion from Eden:

Positive freedom, Fromm maintains, comes through the actualization of individuality in balance with the separation from the whole: a "solidarity with all men", united not by instinctual or predetermined ties, but on the basis of a freedom founded on reason.

See also 
 Mutual liberty
 Negative and positive rights
 Real freedom
 Rule according to higher law
 The Trap (TV documentary series)

References

Further reading
 
 Nicholas Dent, Rousseau, Routledge, 2005.

Political concepts
Social concepts
Free will
Rights
Human rights concepts